Lloyd Mayer (June 21, 1952 – September 5, 2013) was an American gastroenterologist and immunologist. He was Professor and Co-Director of the Immunology institute at the Mount Sinai Medical Center, now known as the Marc and Jennifer Lipschultz Precision Immunology Institute.

Mayer's research on inflammatory bowel disease pathogenesis was among the first to demonstrate the role played  by T-regulatory cells in setting the stage for chronic mucosal inflammation (IBD). He was the first to describe the role of T cells in immunoglobulin class switching and to identify a novel T-cell-derived cytokine (446-BCDF) that stimulates antibody secretion by human B cells.

Mayer was Professor and Co-Director of the Immunology institute at the Mount Sinai Medical Center and the Dorothy and David Merksamer Professor of Medicine, as well as Professor of Microbiology at the Mount Sinai School of Medicine.

Mayer was the author of multiple book chapters and close to 200 peer-reviewed papers. He has been included in New York Magazine’s list of Best Doctors since its inception in the 1990s.

Dr. Mayer died following a three-year battle with brain cancer (Glioblastoma) in September 2013.

Biography
Mayer was born in 1952. He earned his medical degree from the Mount Sinai School of Medicine in 1976. He completed an internship and a residency in Internal Medicine at Bellevue Hospital Center/New York University in 1979 and a fellowship in Gastroenterology at the Mount Sinai Medical Center in 1981.

Mayer held an appointment at the Rockefeller University from 1980–1984, first as a post-doctoral fellow then Assistant Professor. He was Associate Professor of Medicine and Microbiology at Mount Sinai Medical Center from 1985–1986 and was named Director of the Division of Clinical Immunology in 1986. He was named Professor of both Medicine and Microbiology in 1990, then Vice Chair of Medicine. In 1994, he became the David and Dorothy Merksamer Chair of Medicine, and in 1997, Professor of Immunobiology and Chair of Mount Sinai's Immunobiology Center.

From 1992–1997, Mayer served on the Immunological Sciences Study Section of the National Institutes of Health.

Mayer served as Director of the Mount Sinai's Division of Gastroenterology from 2003–2010. In 2007, he was named Co-Director of Mount Sinai's Immunology Institute. He has served as Chairman of the National Scientific Advisory Committee of the Crohn's & Colitis Foundation of America since 2008.

Mayer was elected to the American Society for Clinical Investigation in 1991 and the Association of American Physicians in 1997. He was an active member of the American Board of Internal Medicine and Gastroenterology at the time of his death.

Honors and awards
Sigma Xi (Science Honor Society), 1972
Alpha Omega Alpha, 1975 and 1976
Mosby Award for Clinical Excellence, 1976
Irma T. Hirschl Trust Award, 1986
Saul Horowitz, Jr. Award, 1986
Jeffrey Modell Foundation Lifetime Achievement Award, 1990
American Society for Clinical Investigation, 1991
Immunological Sciences Study section, 1992–1997
Association of American Physicians, 1997
Jaffe Food Allergy Institute Scientific Achievement Award, 1998
Scientific Achievement Award, Crohn's and Colitis Foundation of America, 2000
Jacobi Medallion, 2002
Scientific Achievement in IBD: Basic Research Award, Crohn's & Colitis Foundation of America, 2010

Current research

Grants
A partial list of active grants on which Mayer is a principal or co-investigator:
Immunologic Basis of Cow Milk-Induced Hypersensitivities, NIH/NIAD, 5 U19 AI044236-11
Innate/Adaptive Immune Interaction in Gut Inflammation, NIH/NIDDK, 5 P01 DK072201-04
Cellular & Molecular Defects in Human B Cell Development, NIH/NIAID, 5 P01 AI061093-05
Immunobiology of Peanut Allergy and its Treatment: A Prototype, NIH/NIAID, 1 U19 AI066738-03
Epithelial TLR Signaling and IgA Production, NIH/NIAID, 1 R21 AI083381-01
Oral Vaccine Platform for Class A Bacterial Agents, NIH, 1 R01 AI084952
Generation and Characterization of Intestinal CD8+ Regulatory T cell lines, NIH 1 RC1 DK086605

Clinical trials
Active clinical trials include:
Infliximab for post-op recurrence of Crohn's disease

Publications
Partial list:

References

External links
The Mount Sinai Hospital homepage
The Mount Sinai School of Medicine homepage

1952 births
2013 deaths
Icahn School of Medicine at Mount Sinai alumni
Icahn School of Medicine at Mount Sinai faculty
Union College (New York) alumni